NGC 884 (also known as χ Persei) is an open cluster located 7640 light years away in the constellation of Perseus. It is the easternmost of the Double Cluster with NGC 869. NGC 869 and 884 are often designated h and χ Persei, respectively. The cluster is about 14 million years old. Located in the Perseus OB1 association, both clusters are located physically close to one another, only a few hundred light years apart. The clusters were first recorded by Hipparchus, thus have been known since antiquity.

The Double Cluster is a favorite of amateur astronomers. These bright clusters are often photographed or observed with small telescopes. Easy to find, the clusters are visible with the unaided eye between the constellations of Perseus and Cassiopeia as a brighter patch in the winter Milky Way. The Double Cluster was also included in the Caldwell catalogue, a catalogue of astronomical objects for amateur observation.

In small telescopes, the cluster appears as a beautiful assemblage of bright stars located in a rich star field. Dominated by bright blue stars, the cluster also hosts a few orange stars that add to the visual interest. Both clusters together offer a spectacular low-magnification view.

References

External links

NGC 884 at SEDS
NGC 884 at Messier45

Open clusters
Perseus (constellation)
0884
Persei, Chi
Astronomical objects known since antiquity